François Prévôt-Leygonie (born July 1967) is a French film director, dramatist, screenwriter and actor who works essentially with Stéphan Archinard.

Filmography  
Director, in collaboration with Stéphan Archinard
 2013 : Amitiés sincères
 2015 : La surface de réparation
 2015 : Tout Schuss

Actor
 1995 : Une femme française (feature film) by Régis Wargnier
 1997 : On Guard by Philippe de Broca
 2005 : Le plus beau jour de sa vie (short film) by Stéphan Archinard

Theatre 
Author, with Stéphan Archinard
 2005 : Amitiés sincères, directed by Bernard Murat

References

External links 
 François Prévôt-Leygonie on AlloCiné
 "Montivilliers : du théâtre le vendredi 8 et le samedi 9 avril, salle Michel-Henri", ]
 Notice on Variety.

21st-century French dramatists and playwrights
French film directors
French male screenwriters
French screenwriters
French male actors
1967 births
Living people
21st-century French screenwriters
Film people from Besançon